"The Lady Came from Baltimore" (sometimes shown as "Lady Came from Baltimore") is a song written by American singer-songwriter Tim Hardin, who recorded and released it as a track on his album Tim Hardin 2 in 1967.   The song was inspired by Hardin's relationship with his wife, Susan Yardley Morss, who acted under the name Susan Yardley and who came from a prosperous family in Baltimore who disapproved of the relationship; Hardin's lyrics refer to "Susan Moore".

Other versions
The song was recorded by Bobby Darin, before Hardin's own version had been released.  Darin's recording reached number 62 on the Billboard Hot 100 in April 1967. Other artists who recorded the song included Scott Walker, on his debut solo album Scott. The song was also performed by Bob Dylan on tour in 1992 and 1994.

Johnny Cash version

Covered by Johnny Cash, the song was released as a single in 1974 and subsequently included on his 1975 album John R. Cash. The B-side contained the song "Lonesome to the Bone" penned by Cash himself. The single peaked at number 14 on US Billboards country chart for the week of February 8, 1975.

Track listing

Charts:  Johnny Cash version

References

External links 
 "The Lady Came from Baltimore" on the Johnny Cash official website

Bobby Darin songs
Bob Dylan songs
Johnny Cash songs
1974 songs
1974 singles
Songs written by Tim Hardin
Columbia Records singles